The 2003–04 season saw Bury compete in the Football League Third Division where they finished in 12th position with 56 points.

Final league table

Results

Legend

Football League Third Division

FA Cup

League Cup

League Trophy

Squad statistics

References

External links
 Bury 2003–04 at Soccerbase.com (select relevant season from dropdown list)
 Bury 2003–04  at statto.com

Bury F.C. seasons
Bury